Lim Joon-Sik or Im Joon-Sik (born 13 September 1981) is a South Korea footballer who play as a (midfielder)

Honours

Club honours
Sriwijaya
Indonesia Super League champions (1): 2011–12

Persipura Jayapura
Indonesia Super League champions (1): 2013

References

External links
Profile at liga-indonesia.co.id
 

1981 births
Living people
South Korean footballers
Association football defenders
Association football midfielders
South Korean expatriate footballers
Expatriate footballers in Indonesia
K League 1 players
Jeonnam Dragons players
Ulsan Hyundai Mipo Dockyard FC players
Liga 1 (Indonesia) players
Sriwijaya F.C. players
Persipura Jayapura players